The Dongguk Jeongun (Standard Rhymes of the Eastern States) is a Korean dictionary of rhymes which sets out a standard practice for pronouncing Chinese characters in Korean. It was compiled between 1446 and 1448 under the instructions of Sejong the Great, and serves as a companion volume to his Hunminjeongeum.

It was one of the first printed books in Korea, using both woodblock printing and metal type printing. Woodblocks were used for the larger characters (whose calligraphy is attributed to Prince Jinyang) and metal for the smaller text.

An extant original version of the book is held at the Museum of Konkuk University.

References

Korean books
Hangul